Canary Islands Goldcrest may refer to:

 Tenerife Goldcrest
 Western Canary Islands Goldcrest